The Methodist Central Hall, 196–224 Corporation Street, Birmingham, England, is a three-storey red brick and terracotta Grade II* listed building with a distinctive tower at the northern end of Corporation Street. The design complements the Victoria Law Courts opposite, also in terracotta, and includes eclectic details such as the corner turrets resembling Indian chattris.  It is located within the Steelhouse Conservation Area.

The terracotta was manufactured by the renowned firm of Gibbs and Canning of Tamworth, which also produced decorative works for 179-203 Corporation Street and the interior of the Victoria Law Courts in Birmingham and the Natural History Museum in London.
It was built 1903–04 by architects Ewan Harper & James A. Harper. The main hall seated 2,000 and it had more than 30 other rooms, including three school halls. It cost £96,165.

The street level has twelve bays of shops (four with their original fronts). The building also runs along Ryder Street and has more original shop fronts. 

In 1991, the Methodist Church was converted into the Que Club, a nightclub and music venue; however, since its closure in 2002, the building fell empty and was poorly maintained. Currently it is only partially in use and its deteriorating condition has led to it being listed on Historic England's Heritage at Risk Register. The building has been the subject of various proposals for conversion to apartments and offices.  In 2018 Birmingham City Council approved plans to restore and renovate the building including a 147-bed hotel.

In July 2022, it was announced that Press Up Entertainment, would begin converting the building into a 150 bedroom hotel and event space following a grant of planning permission.

Notes

References

External links

Romanesque Revival church buildings in England
Terracotta
Former Methodist churches in the United Kingdom
Methodist churches in the West Midlands (county)
Churches in Birmingham, West Midlands
Grade II* listed buildings in Birmingham
Grade II* listed churches in the West Midlands (county)
Nightclubs in Birmingham, West Midlands